CPSR may refer to:

 Centre for Postgraduate Studies and Research, at  Tunku Abdul Rahman University College, Malaysia
 Computer Professionals for Social Responsibility
 Current Program Status Register, an ARM computer processor feature